Marja-Liisa Plats (born 16 December 1984) is an Estonian illustrator, graphic designer, photographer, and singer.

She has graduated from Tartu Art College in photography.

She has illustrated over 40 children's books. She has listed twice in White Ravens catalogue.

She is a member of Young Authors' Association in Tartu and Tartu Artists' Union.

References

Living people
1984 births
Estonian women illustrators
Estonian children's book illustrators
21st-century Estonian women artists
Estonian photographers
Estonian designers
People from Räpina
Estonian women photographers